Mafalda is an Argentine comic strip.

Mafalda may also refer to:

People

People with the mononym
 Mafalda (British singer) (born 1994), British singer-songwriter and member of the Bulgarian royal family
 Mafalda of Portugal (c. 1195 – 1256), Portuguese infanta
 Matilda of Savoy, Queen of Portugal (1125–1158), or Mafalda, wife of King Afonso I of Portugal
 Princess Mafalda of Savoy (1902–1944), wife of Prince Philipp of Hesse
 Mafalda of Portugal (born 1153), Portuguese infanta
 Maud of Apulia (c. 1060 – c. 1112), or Mafalda
 Mafalda of Castile (1191–1204), an infanta of Castile

People with the given name
 Mafalda Arnauth (born 1974), Portuguese singer
 Mafalda Favero (1905–1981), Italian opera singer
 Mafalda Luís de Castro (born 1989), Portuguese actress
 Mafalda Pereira (born 1976), Portuguese skier
 Mafalda Pinto (born 1983), Portuguese actress and model
 Mafalda Piovano (fl. 1952–1955), Argentine politician
 Mafalda Salvatini (1886–1971), Italian opera singer
 Mafalda Veiga (born 1965), Portuguese singer-songwriter
 Mafalda von Hessen (born 1965), Princess Mafalda of Hesse, German aristocrat and fashion designer
 Princess Mafalda Mafalda Arrivabene-Valenti-Gonzaga (born 1969), daughter of Amedeo, 5th Duke of Aosta

People with the surname
 Eloísa Mafalda (1924–2018), Brazilian actress

Other uses 
 Mafalda, Molise, a town in Italy
 Mafalda Hopkirk, a minor character in the Harry Potter universe
 SS Principessa Mafalda, an Italian ocean liner that sank in a disaster in 1927
 Mafaldine, or Mafalda, a kind of pasta

See also

Matilda (name)